The 1933 Primera División was the 42nd season of top-flight football in Argentina. It continued with both associations organising tournaments. The official AFA season did not have relegations at the end of the championship while Sportivo Acassuso made its debut in Primera. On the other hand, the dissident professional league (LAF) organised its 3rd. championship, in which relegation took place for the first time, with 5 teams sent to the second division.

The amateur AFA season was won by Dock Sud, achieving its first title in Primera División, with Alfonso Lorenzo (Barracas Central) being the topscorer with 16 goals.

The professional LAF tournament was won by San Lorenzo de Almagro that obtained its 4° Primera División title. Francisco Varallo of Boca Juniors was the top goalscorer with 34 goals.

Final tables

Asociación Argentina de Football (AFA)

Liga Argentina de Football

Top goalscorers

Notes
1.Tigre and Quilmes were relegated by league decision. Talleres (Escalada) and Lanús were merged in Unión Talleres-Lanús. Atlanta and Argentinos Juniors were merged in Atlanta-Argentinos Juniors. The latter two were allowed to stay in the league.

References

Argentine Primera División seasons
Argentine Primera Division
Primera Division